Sabinal is a city in Uvalde County, Texas, United States. The population was 1,695 at the 2010 census.

Geography

Sabinal is located at  (29.320678, –99.468887).

According to the United States Census Bureau, the city has a total area of 1.2 square miles (3.1 km), all of it land.

Climate

The climate in this area is characterized by hot, humid summers and generally mild to cool winters.  According to the Köppen Climate Classification system, Sabinal has a humid subtropical climate, abbreviated "Cfa" on climate maps.

Demographics

2020 Census

As of the 2020 United States census, there were 1,364 people, 458 households, and 234 families residing in the city.

2000 Census
As of the census of 2000, there were 1,586 people, 560 households, and 417 families residing in the city. The population density was 1,336.3 people per square mile (514.6/km). There were 655 housing units at an average density of 551.9/sq mi (212.5/km). The racial makeup of the city was 79.51% White, 0.06% African American, 0.19% Native American, 0.06% Asian, 0.06% Pacific Islander, 16.46% from other races, and 3.66% from two or more races. Hispanic or Latino of any race were 64.06% of the population.

There were 560 households, out of which 38.6% had children under the age of 18 living with them, 58.2% were married couples living together, 12.7% had a female householder with no husband present, and 25.5% were non-families. 23.6% of all households were made up of individuals, and 12.9% had someone living alone who was 65 years of age or older. The average household size was 2.83 and the average family size was 3.39.

In the city, the population was spread out, with 30.1% under the age of 18, 7.9% from 18 to 24, 25.9% from 25 to 44, 20.9% from 45 to 64, and 15.3% who were 65 years of age or older. The median age was 35 years. For every 100 females, there were 94.8 males. For every 100 females age 18 and over, there were 90.2 males.

The median income for a household in the city was $26,429, and the median income for a family was $31,776. Males had a median income of $25,169 versus $16,250 for females. The per capita income for the city was $12,393. About 17.2% of families and 21.6% of the population were below the poverty line, including 26.9% of those under age 18 and 19.8% of those age 65 or over.

Education
The city is served by the Sabinal Independent School District.

References

Cities in Uvalde County, Texas
Cities in Texas